Bonita Anne Friedericy (born October 10, 1961) is an American actress, best known for her role as Diane Beckman in the NBC series Chuck. Her husband is actor John Billingsley.

Early life
Friedericy was born in Charlottesville, Virginia, was raised in Palos Verdes, California, and worked as a teacher for nearly 13 years to help supplement her acting income.

Career 
In the 1990s, she began her career on stage, and won Ovation Award for her role in the Los Angeles production of Our Country's Good. She later guest-starred in a number of television shows, such as Malcolm in the Middle, Veronica Mars, Star Trek: Enterprise, Criminal Minds, Bones, Dharma & Greg, Parks and Recreation, The Nine, The West Wing, CSI: Crime Scene Investigation, Castle, Monk. In film, Friedericy appeared in Christmas with the Kranks, Alien Raiders, Paranormal Activity 3, and The Lords of Salem.

From 2007 to 2012, Friedericy starred in the NBC comedy series Chuck as NSA General Diane Beckman for the show's entire five-season run. She had a recurring role in the first three seasons, and was promoted as a series regular in the fourth season. On November, 2013, she was cast as series regular in the Lifetime comedy-drama UnREAL opposite Shiri Appleby, in the role of a psychologist. She later was replaced by Amy Hill in the role. In 2015, she appeared on the second season of ABC's How to Get Away with Murder.

She provided the voice of Caroline Becker in the 2014 video game Wolfenstein: The New Order, a member of the underground Allied resistance group Kreisau Circle.

Filmography

Film

Television

References

External links
 
 StarTrek.com article - an interview with Bonita and John 

1961 births
American film actresses
American television actresses
American video game actresses
Living people
20th-century American actresses
21st-century American actresses